Hypatopa solea is a moth in the family Blastobasidae. It is found in Costa Rica.

The length of the forewings is 5–6.9 mm. The forewings are brown intermixed with pale-brown scales and a few dark-brown scales or dark brown intermixed with brown and a few pale-brown scales. The hindwings are translucent pale brown.

Etymology
The specific name is derived from Latin solum (meaning a leather sole strapped on the foot, a sandal).

References

Moths described in 2013
Hypatopa